Turkey Wealth Fund (TWF) (Turkish: Türkiye Varlık Fonu, TVF) is a $33 billion sovereign wealth fund founded in August 2016 owned by Government of Turkey. The fund is operated with "Strategic Investment Plan", which was approved by the Cabinet. Companies and assets formerly owned by state institutions, shall be eligible to be transferred to the fund and sub-funds shall be able to created if viewed appropriate.

History 
TWF is founded officially on 26 August 2016. According to the law published, chairman, CEO and board members were appointed by the Prime Minister. In November 2016, PM Binali Yıldırım appointed board members and Mehmet Bostan as CEO.

On 6 February 2017, it was announced that Ziraat Bankası, Turkish Airlines, TÜRKSAT, BOTAŞ, PTT, BİST, TPAO, Türk Telekom (6,68%), Eti Maden, Çaykur have been handed over to TWF.  In addition to the companies, 3 billion liras worth Defense Industry Support Fund (Turkish: Savunma Sanayii Destekleme Fonu) were transferred to TWF for 3 months.  The fund also has several lands in Antalya, Aydın, İstanbul, Isparta, İzmir, Kayseri and Muğla, which were previously owned by Treasury of Turkey. Treasury stakes of Turkish Airlines (49,12%) and Halkbank (51,11%) were also handed over to the fund.

2018 changes 
After 2017 Turkish constitutional referendum, Prime Ministry of Turkey was abolished. In accordance with this change, TWF law is changed to allow President of Turkey became the chairman of TWF and appointment of CEO, Vice Chairman and board members by the President. On 12 September, President Erdoğan became chairman of the fund. He also appointed Zafer Sonmez, formerly of Malaysia's government investment vehicle Khazanah Nasional from September 2012 until September 2018, as Senior Vice President & Head. Erdoğan's son-in-law Berat Albayrak was named as his deputy on the board of the sovereign wealth fund.

2020 changes 
In April 2020, TWF Financial Investments was founded with previously government owned shares insurance companies. TWF acquired non-government shares and merger was completed in September 2020; “Türkiye Sigorta” was founded with merging Güneş Sigorta, Halk Sigorta, Ziraat Sigorta and “Türkiye Hayat ve Emeklilik” was founded with merging Vakıf Emeklilik ve Hayat, Halk Hayat ve Emeklilik and Ziraat Hayat ve Emeklilik.

On 18 June 2020, the TWF agreed to acquire 26.2% shares of Turkcell from Telia and Çukurova Holding for US$1,801 million, including US$196 million to Telia and US$1,605 million loan from Ziraat Bank. On 22 September 2020 following amendments to Articles of Association, the fund has gained the right to appoint five of the nine members of the board of Turkcell.

On 26 November 2020, TWF announced selling %10 stakes of Borsa Istanbul to QIA which was previously acquired from EBRD The next day, Vice Chairman Albayrak announced his resignation, whom previously resigned from Ministry of Finance.

On 10 March 2022, TWF acquired controlling stakes of Türk Telekom for 1.65B USD in order to resolve handover issues in 2026.

Management

Companies 

Licenses:
 Millî Piyango (for 49 years)
 Jockey Club of Turkey (for 49 years)

References 

Sovereign wealth funds
Government-owned companies of Turkey